"Last Night at the Jetty" is the third single to be released by Panda Bear from Tomboy. It was released December 13, 2010 by FatCat Records. The sleeve was designed by Scott Mou, Panda Bear's collaborator from the group Jane. The B side label of the record features an image of the Flatwoods Monster.

The One Thirty BPM website gave the single a positive response with an 8/10 and proclaimed it 'succeeds'. Pitchfork Media would list the song as the 43rd best track of 2011.

Track listing

References

2010 songs